Navamani Elia Peter was the President of the Bible Society of India headquartered in Bangalore from 2007 through 2013.

In 2000, the nation's first University, the Senate of Serampore College (University) conferred upon Navamani an honorary doctorate degree, Doctor of Divinity.  Navamani has been member of the Association of Theologically Trained Women of India and held the elected post of President for nearly six bienniums.

References

Further reading
 
 
 
 
 
 

Telugu people
Methodist theologians
Methodist evangelists
Methodist missionaries in India
Methodist writers
Living people
Indian Christian theologians
Indian feminists
Senate of Serampore College (University) alumni
Year of birth missing (living people)